The Artmania Festival (stylized as ARTmaИ!a Festival) is an art festival, held in the Romanian town of Sibiu. The festival, one of the most important projects developed by ARTmania, was first organized in the summer of 2006 and it has been held every summer since.

The main attraction of the festival is the music: rock and metal bands perform in the Large Square (Piaţa Mare) during the first two days weekend of the festival. Major bands have performed at the festival including Nightwish, HIM, Opeth, Amorphis, Anathema, Lacrimosa, Tiamat, My Dying Bride and Within Temptation and the festival grows each year.

The ARTmania Festival also features other cultural events, such as: visual art exhibitions, museum exhibitions, film screenings, classical music performances, lectures, workshops and parties.

The annual festival in Sibiu has become known by promoting gothic metal artists or other metal genres, extending its coverage to heavy metal, punk and even alternative rock. Music represents the leitmotif of the festival, closely followed by visual arts, especially photography and painting.

Concerts along the years

2019
Performing artists/band were, among others:
 Dream Theater
 Opeth
 Madrugada
 Wardruna
 Architects
 Alcest

2018
Performing artists/band were, among others:
 Mogwai
 Steven Wilson
 Leprous
 Haken
 Zeal & Ardor
 Arcane Roots
 Rome
 Distorted Harmony

2017
Performing artists/band were, among others:
 Tarja
 You Me at Six
 Devin Townsend Project
 Lacuna Coil
 Riverside
 Beyond the Black

2016
Performing artists/band were, among others:
 Ihsahn
 Pain of Salvation
 Sólstafir
 Black Peaks
 The Foreshadowing
 Fantazia

2015
Performing artists/band were, among others:
 Anathema
 Apocalyptica
 Saturnus
 Clan of Xymox

2014
Performing artists/band were, among others:
 Rage
 Therion
 Eluveitie
 Diary of Dreams
 Equilibrium
 Rîul Doamnei
 Zdob și Zdub
 Alternosfera
 Peter Hammill
 Hauschka
 Daemonia Nymphe
 65daysofstatic
 EF

2013
Performing artists/band were, among others:
 Within Temptation
 Lacrimosa
 Haggard
 Orphaned Land
 Deine Lakaien
 Amaranthe
 Xandria
 Alternosfera

2012
Performing artists/band were, among others:
 Die Toten Hosen
 My Dying Bride
 Edguy
 Epica
 Deathstars
 Delain
 Poets of the Fall
 Trail of Tears
 Alternosfera

2011
Performing artists/band were, among others:
 Tarja
 Helloween
 Sonata Arctica
 Lacrimas Profundere
 Lacuna Coil
 Republica

2010
Performing artists/band were, among others:
 Serj Tankian
 The Sisters of Mercy
 Kamelot
 Sirenia
 Dark Tranquillity
 Swallow the Sun
 A.C.T
 Grimus

2009
Performing artists/band were, among others:
 Nightwish
 Pain
 Tristania
 Opeth
 My Dying Bride
 Luna Amară

2008
Performing artists/band were, among others:
 Lacrimosa
 Gamma Ray
 Atrocity
 Tiamat
 Negură Bunget
 Leaves’ Eyes
 Agua de Annique

2007
Performing artists/band were, among others:
 Within Temptation
 My Dying Bride
 Anathema
 The Gathering
 Haggard
 Tarot
 Iris
 Cargo
 Celelalte Cuvinte

2006
Performing artists/band were, among others:
 HIM
 Amorphis
 Luna Amara
 Silentium
 Altar
 Kumm
 Carmen Gray

Visual Arts Exhibitions
All exhibitions Romanian, unless otherwise stated.

2014
 "What I dream" by Julieanne Kost
 "Childhood fears" by Joshua Hoffine

2013
 "7 days and 7 nights" - by Roman Tolici at Habitus Cultural Centre - The art exhibition brings into the spotlight fragments of the projections of the world, of life and death. 
 "From White to Black" - an exhibition signed by Ioana Popescu. The young artist bring to Sibiu a black and white photo collection illustrating a minutious capture of the human feelings, dreams, hopes and uncertainties.  
 "Galateca presents a selection of engravings, drawings, photo collage, watercolors and bibliophile books by internationally renowned artists: Simon Henwood, Mircea Roman, Mircea Nechita and Edward Gorey.

2012
 Ingeri (Angels) by Adrian Alexandru Ilfoveanu at Habitus Cultural Centre - bronze and wooden sculpture exhibition
 Amazing Universe - 50 years of ESO, astronomical images/photo exhibition.
 Festival Scraps - concert photography exhibition by Alex and Andreea Lupascu at Art Cafe in the Large Square.
 Sorin Dumitrescu - Mihaesti - painting exhibition, ART Vo Gallery

2011
 Din Adancuri (From the Deep) by Anda Cofaru at the Habitus Cultural Centre – exhibition inspired by Tarja Turunen’s music
 “Rock Memorandum” by Diana and Doina Pantea – exhibition at the Habitus Cultural Centre
 the photographic exhibition ARTnatomy- The Reconfiguring Eye, by Miluta Flueras at the Artists’ Café, ArtCafe in the Large Square
 Live Aeons exhibition by Victor Cristescu and Dumitru Catalin - a collection of photographs

2010
 Neo-gothic living vs. The Age of Enlightenment Model – exhibition at the Brukenthal Museum
 ARTmania Festival in images – photo exhibition hosted by tourist information Center
 Ichtys” Paintings by Niklas Sundin (DT) – hosted by Bohemian Flow

2009
 “From A Dark Mind” Photo exhibition – offered by Aaron Stainthorpe (MY DYING BRIDE) hosted by Habitus Center
 “Toymania" Exhibition  – visual arts exhibition of Romanian artist Daniel Turcu hosted by the Contemporary Art Gallery
 LIVE on canvas – visual arts show & exhibition by Anda Cofaru Romanian visual artist hosted by Mayoralty Lobby
 Colorful images – animated films projections by Mihai Badica Romanian visual artist hosted by Art Cafe

2008
 Jan Kaila visual arts exhibition hosted by the Brukenthal Museum of Sibiu. Jan Kaila is Head of the Post-university Studies Department from the Academy of Fine Arts of Helsinki and has a PHd in visual arts
 ELINA BROTHERUS visual arts exhibition hosted by the Brukenthal Museum of Sibiu. Elina Broherus one of the most “en vogue” artistic figures of today’s international artistic world.
 Romanian Arts Exhibition – visual arts exhibition of several Romanian artists hosted by the Contemporary Art Museum of Sibiu

Literature events
All events Romanian.

2014
 "In cautarea fericirii" de Manu Anghelescu
 Poezie - Claudiu Komartin & Vlad Pojoga
 "Sick Rose" - Luna Miguel & Catalina Stanislav
 Concert Stefana Fratila
 Acluofobia - A. R. Deleanu
 Arta Sunetelor
 Escapada - Lavinia Braniste
 "Vom tacea, vom strange din dinti" cu Krista Szocs si Aleksandar Stoicovici
 "Tripuri, eroi si metode" cu Florentin Popa si Vlad Dragoi

2013
 "Urban Comics made in Cluj" - a comic album inspired by urban legends. The comic books are available in Romania and German.
 Bookaholic - "How do we read in the digital era?" - we will try to find the answer with the writers Cecilia Stefanescu, Florin Iaru, Paul Balogh (specialist in digital publishing) in a meeting moderated by Cristina Foarfa and organized by Bookaholic.ro.
 Press @ school - a debate about what journalism means to the new generation, about what it means to write, to take interviews, to find attractive topics, to make people read; a debate about people you should listen to, about the people you should bring close to you; about the borderline between reportage and art.
 "ARTmaniere Poetice #2" - contemporary poetry read by Claudiu Komartin, Vlad Pojora, Ilinca Pop and Catalina Stanislav. Ana Toma's piano will double the entire period of the reading.

2012
 Artmaniere poetice. Contemporary poetry read by Rita Chirian, Claudiu Komartin, Vlad Pojoga and Radu Vancu (the new Romanian literary generation), at Habitus Gallery, Sibiu.
 Novel presentation ”Namaste”, by Sega, at Humanitas Library, Sibiu.

2011
 Launch of “Room mates. Student in Chisinau” novel by Mihail Vakulovski – in Large Square, Sibiu

2010
 Launch of “Bazar bizar” novel by Radu Paraschivescu – at Astra Library in Sibiu
 Launch of “Fotbalistic manifest” of Traian Ungureanu – at Astra Library in Sibiu

Classical music Concerts & other genre
All events Romanian, unless otherwise stated.

2014
 Peter Hammill acoustic concert at Brukenthal Palace, Large Square. The most influential and impressive progressive rock voice of all time has mesmerized the audience at ARTmania Festival 2014 in an exclusive solo performance.
 The legendary piano innovator, Hauschka concerted at the Gong Theatre, Sibiu. 
 Daemonia Nymphe, the contemporary NeoFolk treasure from Greece, came to Sibiu and performed at the Gong Theatre during ARTmania Festival 2014.
 Tides From Nebula, one of the best Post-Rock bands in Europe, performed at ARTmania Festival on the Altemberger stage.
 65daysofstatic offered a unique experience on Thursday, August 7, in Sibiu, during ARTmania Festival. 
 Growth. Experiment. Focus. These are the 3 key words for one of Europe’s hardest working and continuously promising acts who performed at ARTmania Festival Sibiu. EF concert, at Altemberger Stage.

2013
 Deine Lakaien acoustic concert - at Brukenthal Palace Large Square. The great representatives of the avant garde of electronic music came to ARTmania Festival with an intense performance, full of emotions. Supported by Bosch Rexroth.

2012
 Fado Concert by Maria Raducanu and Portuguese text lecture by Mihai Alexandru at Habitus Gallery. Supported by Instituto Camoes of Bucharest.

2011
 Guilty Lemon concert – jazz concert hosted by Art Cafe.

2010
 Classical music Festival-Contest „Carl Filtsch” - piano concerts and classical music recitals offered by young Romanian artists in Thalia music hall of Sibiu
 “Carl Filtsch” Gala concert – offered by the winners of the “Carl Filtsch” classical music contest in Thalia music hall of Sibiu

Film screening
All events Romanian, unless otherwise stated.

2014
 "Shivers 1" powered by Dracula International Film Festival.
 "Shivers 2" powered by Dracula International Film Festival.
 "Shivers 3" powered by Dracula International Film Festival.
 "House of Dracula" powered by Dracula International Film Festival.
 "Dracula's Daughter" powered by Dracula International Film Festival.

2013
 Full Moon Preview 2013 - at Habitus Gallery. Presented 4 fantastic short-films that oscillates between absurd and macabre.
 Political Dress powered by The Polish Institute - at Habitus Gallery. 
 Child's Pose - in premiere at Sibiu - at Habitus Gallery. Directed by Calin Peter Netzer, is a film about the traumas of children suffocated by love and about the marks that parents leave upon their children's personality. 
 Rocker - powered by Transilvania Film - at Habitus Gallery. Directed by Marian Crisan. 
{ Killing Time - in premiere at Sibiu - at Habitus Gallery. Directed by Florin Piersic Jr. Plot: two robbers await their next victim in an empty apartment. The hour pass. Tension rises. Innocent jokes turn into taunts. Insults become threats. Blood will flow.
 Life Principles - at Habitus Gallery. A film by Constantin Popescu. Screening supported by PARADA Film.
 Avalon - at Habitus Gallery. Five short-films (four fiction and one documentary). Supported by Cervantes Institute in collaboration with the External Affairs Ministry and the International Cooperation of Spain.
 Romanian short powered by Timishort - at Habitus Gallery. The short movies selection presented at ARTmania is made up of movies that participated at the 2013 edition of Timishort National Competition. 
 FAMU Shorts powered by the Czech Cultural Centre - at Habitus Gallery. FAMU - Film and TV School of the Academy of Performing Arts in Prague.
 Austrian Shorts - at Habitus Gallery. The Austrian Shorts Series consists of a selection of 15 Austrian short-films, all nominated at the "Best Short-Film" section in 2012.

2012
 Preview ”Luna Plina” Festival at Habitus Gallery. Powered by The Association for the Promotion of Romanian Films and Transilvania International Film Festival.
 - Year of the Devil at Habitus Gallery. Powered by the Czech Centre.
 - Beats of Freedom at Habitus Gallery. Powered by the Polish Institute.
 Romanian Animation, powered by Anim`est at Habitus Gallery.
 Best of Anim`est 2011, powered by Anim`est at Habitus Gallery.
 - FutureShorts - Summer Season at Habitus Gallery.
 - ”Hubble - 15 years of discoveries” at Habitus Gallery.
 - ”Eyes on The Skies” at Habitus Gallery. Powered by ESO.

2011
 Punksters & Youngsters (FI) 2008 – an ASTRA film projection in the Small Square

Museum exhibitions
All events Romanian, unless otherwise stated.

2013
 The ASTRA National Museum Complex, together with the Romanian Peasant Museum in Bucharest, with the support of the Turkish Democratic Union in Romania, brings to the attention of the public the Ada Kaleh island - the island of dream and oblivion - at Casa Hermes, Small Square.
 "To found, to build...to become" - at Casa Artelor, Small Square. Traditional tools, vintage photographs. 
 "The fair of the traditional creators of Romania" - ASTRA National Museum Complex.
 "The national festival of traditions" - ASTRA National Museum Complex.
 "Gothic" - Brukenthal National Museum, Large Square. Is the first to explore the roots of the phenomenon in the visual arts at the end of the 18th century and throughout the 19th century, highlighting the literary sources and the historical context of the neo-gothic reaction to the Enlightenment. 
 "Poeme pentru pasari si extraterestrii" - by Cristian Badilita. At Contemporary Art Gallery.

2010
 Romanian Traditional Craftsmen Fair – Museum of Traditional Folk Civilization (ASTRA National Museum Complex)
 “Contemporary Norwegian arts and crafts” exhibition – architecture and design exhibition hosted in House of Arts from the Small Square of Sibiu
 Traditional art exhibitions – Museum of Transylvanian Civilization
 Exhibitions – “Emil Sigerus” Museum of German Ethnography and Folk Art
 European Art Gallery & the Brukenthal Library permanent exhibitions – hosted by Brukenthal Pallace
 Romanian Art Gallery & the Restoration studios permanent exhibition- hosted by the Blue House, in the Large Square
 Contemporary Art Gallery permanent exhibitions - within Brukenthal Museum
 “Altemberger House” Museum of History permanent exhibitions - within Brukenthal Museum
 Museum of Natural History permanent exhibitions
 Museum of History of Pharmacy permanent exhibitions – in the Small Square
 ASTRA Museum complex’s permanent exhibitions

Workshops & other cultural manifestations
All events Romanian, unless otherwise stated.

2014
 Carturesti Pop-Up Store
 Lounge area where the crowd saw movies, red books or played board games, learned tattoo ‘do it yourself style’ and got horror movie style make-ups, played with Happy Color and went shopping for music, clothes and accessories, all specially selected for core fans of the festival.

2013
 Bruno Wine Bar - comes to ARTmania to complete the depth of a prose or poetry lecture with a noble wine or a refreshing appetizer for the summer. Bruno Wine Bar introduces in the urban landscape a mix of refinement and tradition with modernity. 
 Editura Vellant - Small Square. Vellant brings a selection of the best books of the year. One of the best publishing houses in Romania, Vellant has published refined books for children, big and small, contemporary novels, art and architecture albums and essay collections that make us see the world in a different way.
 Harley Davidson Parade in the Large Square.

2012
 Katy Babanu -live multimedia workshop in the Small Square (Baroque Garden).
 Noni - live painting, Small Square (Baroque Garden).
 Astronomy workshop ”Hide and Seek in the Solar System” in the Small Square.
 Astronomical Observations in the Small Square.
 Astronomy workshop ”Galaxies - Distant Islands of the Stars” in the Small Square.
 Nego live drawing ”Life is an open door” in the Small Square.
 Astronomy workshop ” The Telescope ” in the Small Square.

2011
 Miluta Flueras - workshop dedicated to concert photography at the Artists’ Café, ArtCafe.

2010
 Kai Hahto (Swallow The Sun) Drum Workshop – workshop powered by Guitar Shop in the Small Square

2009
 “The Art of Fire” - street fire show by Crispus in the Large Square and the Small Square

Warm-up parties & After parties
All events Romanian, unless otherwise stated.

2013
 Opening Party in Bohemian Flow
 "Obsession" performing in Bohemian Flow
 Disaster Party - in Oldies Pub
 Dark Fusion live & Afterparty in Bohemian Flow
 Vespera live & Afterparty in Bohemian Flow
 Closing Party with DJ Hefe in the Small Square

2012
 Welcoming Party with Transylvania Rock Society in Oldies Live Music Pub
 Deathstars Afterparty with Lux Noctis in Oldies Live Music Pub
 Die Toten Hosen Afterparty in Vintage Pub
 ARTmania Warm-up Party with Heavy Hour in Oldies Live Music Pub. Special guest: Kitsune Art(Spain)
 Edguy Afterparty in Vintage Pub
 ARTmania 2012 Closing Party at Oldies Live Music Pub

2010
 SOM Afterparty – by Ian P. Chris (DE) & Ina Lux Noctis at Flying Time club
 Silviu D. Heavy Hour - DJ Set at Bohemian Flow club
 Ina Lux Noctis Afterparty - DJ set at Kultur Cafe Sigi
 Silviu D. Acid Phonique -  Flying Time club

2009
 Silent Noise, Onishka & Ina DJ Set held in Bohemian Flow
 Ewvoll & Nedeea DJ set held in Sigi Kultur Café

2008
 Anathema Warm-Up Party – held in “Grigore Preoteasa” Students Cultural Center, in Bucharest

References

External links
 The official website of ARTmania
 The official website of the ARTmania Festival
 theFest.ro | ARTmania Festival 2014
 theFest.ro | ARTmania Festival 2013

Festivals in Romania
Summer events in Romania
Heavy metal festivals in Romania